Libypithecus markgrafi is an extinct species of primate that lived in the Late Miocene. It is the only species described in the genus Libypithecus.

References

Colobinae
Prehistoric monkeys
Miocene primates of Africa
Prehistoric primate genera
Fossil taxa described in 1913
Monotypic prehistoric primate genera